The Lake Minatare Lighthouse is a historic mock lighthouse located on Lake Minatare near the city of Scottsbluff in Nebraska. The  tower was built by the Veterans Conservation Corps in 1939 and is currently located within the North Platte National Wildlife Refuge. Designed as a combination shelter house and observation tower, it was "built to simulate a lighthouse."

See also
Geography of Nebraska

References

Folly buildings in the United States
Buildings and structures completed in 1939
Buildings and structures in Scotts Bluff County, Nebraska
Tourist attractions in Scotts Bluff County, Nebraska
Observation towers in the United States
1939 establishments in Nebraska